Eric Gayford Lloyd (1 January 1918 – 3 June 2003) was a Real estate agent and member of the Queensland Legislative Assembly.

Early life
Lloyd was born in Brisbane, Queensland, to parents George Henry Lloyd and his wife Edith Lloyd (née Gayford). He was educated at the State Commercial High School. 

On leaving school he was a reporter with the State Reporting Bureau and in World War II he served in the RAAF (458 Squadron) and earning the rank of Flight Lieutenant. He was a navigator in the Battle of Tobruk and won the Distinguished Flying Cross for his efforts there.

Political career
Lloyd, a member of the Labor, represented the seat of Kedron in the Queensland Legislative Assembly from the by-election of 1951 until his retirement from politics in 1972. 

He was the Deputy Opposition Leader from 1957 until 1966. His wife, Bridie, acted in the roles of electorate secretary and election campaigner throughout his 21 years in parliament.

Following the 1966 election Lloyd became the subject of attacks from the extra-parliamentary wing of the Labor party, as well as within the caucus. As a result party leader Jack Duggan supported Jack Houston in challenging Lloyd which he did successfully by 15 votes to 10.

Personal life
On 8 August 1943 Lloyd married Bridie Ross and together had two sons. He died in June 2003 at Peregian Beach.

He was the founding Vice-President of the Queensland 100 Social Bowls Club 1963–1967, a member of the Parliamentary Bowls Club, and a president and life member of the Gaythorne RSL and Services Club.

References

Members of the Queensland Legislative Assembly
1918 births
2003 deaths
Australian Labor Party members of the Parliament of Queensland
20th-century Australian politicians